Hanamori (written: 花森 or 花守) is a Japanese surname. Notable people with the surname include:

, Japanese manga artist
, Japanese voice actress

Fictional characters
, protagonist of the manga series Deka Wanko
, a character from Kado:_The_Right_Answer

Japanese-language surnames